Peter Mercallo Nasir is a South Sudanese politician who is the Minister of Energy and Dams as of 2022.

Appointment 
He was appointed by the president Salva Kiir Mayardit, as the Minister of Energy and Dams in 2020.

See also 
Cabinet of South Sudan

References 

Government ministers of South Sudan

Year of birth missing (living people)
Living people